The Devanga Purana is the kulapuranam, or mythological history, of the Devanga community. It deals with the life of their legendary founder, Devala Maharshi, and his seven incarnations, goddess (Chowdeswari), rituals and customs. The Devanga community reside in all the south Indian states and also split in north Indian states. They are traditionally engaged in cotton cloth weaving and cloth business.

Religion

The main deities of Devangas are  Sri Ramalinga Sowdeswari Amman  or Sri Chowdeshwari Devi and Sri Ramalingeswara.

Translations
Around 1532 CE, Devanga people in Andhra Pradesh requested the Telugu poet Bhadralinga Kavi to write their kulapuranam, which resulted in the Devanga Purana. It is written as poems in the dasimatra-dvipadi style.

References

External links
 Devanga Purana, archive.org (in Kannada)

Puranas